Thalassianthus is a genus of sea anemones of the family Thalassianthidae.

Species 
The following species are recognized:

 Thalassianthus aster Rüppell & Leuckart, 1828
 Thalassianthus kraepelini Carlgren, 190
 Thalassianthus senckenbergianus Kwietniewski, 1896

References 

Thalassianthidae
Hexacorallia genera